The South Carolina Line was a formation within the Continental Army. The term "South Carolina Line" referred to the quota of numbered infantry regiments assigned to South Carolina at various times by the Continental Congress. These, together with similar contingents from the other twelve states, formed the Continental Line. The concept was particularly important in relation to the promotion of commissioned officers. Officers of the Continental Army below the rank of brigadier general were ordinarily ineligible for promotion except in the line of their own state.

Units belonging to the State Line

The following units belonged to the South Carolina State troops initially and were transferred to the Continental Army on the dates indicated.  The original commanders, their ranks, and the dates the units were established and disbanded are included.  

All of the State Troops that became Continental Line were effectively decimated during the Siege of Charleston--either by action or by surrender on May 12, 1780.

Engagements
Between July 1775 and May 1780, the six regiments participated in engagements in South Carolina, North Carolina, Georgia, and Florida.

See also
 List of South Carolina militia units in the American Revolution for a list of South Carolina militia and State troops.

References

Wright, Robert K. The Continental Army. Washington, D.C.: United States Army Center of Military History, 1983. Available TOC, Book.
Bibliography of the Continental Army in South Carolina compiled by the United States Army Center of Military History